Bodell may refer to:

People
 Ernest Bodell (1928–2003), cricketer
 Jack Bodell (1940–2016), boxer
 James Bodell (c. 1831–1892), New Zealand soldier, businessman, local politician and writer
 Norman Bodell (born 1938), footballer

Places
 Bodell River